Swedish has a large vowel inventory, with nine vowels distinguished in quality and to some degree in quantity, making 18 vowel phonemes in most dialects. Swedish pronunciation of most consonants is similar to that of other Germanic languages.  Another notable feature is the pitch accent, which is not found in most European languages.

Finland Swedish has a slightly different phonology.

Vowels

Swedish has nine vowels that, as in many other Germanic languages, exist in pairs of long and short versions. The length covaries with the quality of the vowels, as shown in the table below (long vowels in the first column, short in the second), with short variants being more centered and lax. The length is generally viewed as the primary distinction, with quality being secondary. No short vowels appear in open stressed syllables.  The front vowels appear in rounded-unrounded pairs: –, –, – and –.

In other dialects,  may be central.
  are mid .
  has been variously described as central  and front .

Rounded vowels have two types of rounding:

 ära  →  ('honor')
 ärt  →  ('pea')
 öra  →  ('ear')
 dörr  →  ('door')

This is especially true for the long allophone. Also, the  allophone is sometimes difficult to distinguish from the long .

In some pronunciations, traditionally characteristic of the varieties spoken around Gothenburg and in Östergötland, but today more common e.g. in Stockholm and especially in younger speakers,  and  merge, most commonly into  (especially before  and the retroflex consonants).

In Central Standard Swedish, unstressed  is slightly retracted , but is still a front vowel rather than central . However, the latter pronunciation is commonly found in Southern Swedish. Before , southerners may use a back vowel . In Central Standard Swedish, a true schwa  is commonly found as a vocalic release of word-final lenis stops, as in e.g. bädd  'bed'.

The loss of this contrast has the effect that hetta ('heat') and hätta ('cap') are pronounced the same.

In Central Standard Swedish, long  is weakly rounded . The rounding is stronger in Gothenburg and weaker in most North Swedish dialects.

Peter Ladefoged and Ian Maddieson describe this vowel as being pronounced "by slightly lowering the body of the tongue while simultaneously raising the blade of the tongue (...)

There is some variation in the interpretations of vowel length's phonemicity. , for example, treats vowel quantity as its own separate phoneme (a "prosodeme") so that long and short vowels are allophones of a single vowel phoneme.

Patterns of diphthongs of long vowels occur in three major dialect groups. According to Engstrand, the second element is so close as to become a palatal or bilabial fricative: . Elsewhere in the article, the broad transcription  is used.

A third type of distinctive diphthongs occur in the dialects of Gotland.

Consonants
The table below shows the Swedish consonant phonemes in spoken Standard Swedish.

 are dental , but  can be either dental  or alveolar . If  is alveolar, then  is also alveolar.

Stops

Initial fortis stops are aspirated in stressed position, but unaspirated when preceded by  within the same morpheme. Compare English  ('cool') vs  ('school'). In Finland Swedish, aspiration does not occur and initial lenis stops  are usually voiced throughout. Word-medial lenis stops are sometimes voiceless in Finland, a likely influence from Finnish.

Preaspiration of medial and final fortis stops, including the devoicing of preceding sonorants is common, though its length and normativity varies from dialect to dialect, being optional (and idiolectal) in Central Standard Swedish but obligatory in, for example, the Swedish dialects of Gräsö, Vemdalen and Arjeplog. In Gräsö, preaspiration is blocked in certain environments (such as an  following the fortis consonant or a morpheme boundary between the vowel and the consonant), while it is a general feature of fortis medial consonants in Central Standard Swedish. When not preaspirated, medial and final fortis stops are simply unaspirated. In clusters of fortis stops, the second "presonorant" stop is unaspirated and the former patterns with other medial final stops (that is, it is either unaspirated or is preaspirated).

The phonetic attributes of preaspiration also vary. In the Swedish of Stockholm, preaspiration is often realized as a fricative subject to the character of surrounding vowels or consonants so that it may be labial, velar, or dental; it may also surface as extra length of the preceding vowel. The duration of preaspiration is highest in the dialects of Vemdalen and Arjeplog. Helgason notes that preaspiration is longer after short vowels, in lexically stressed syllables, as well as in pre-pausal position.

Fricatives

 is dental  in Central Standard Swedish, but retracted alveolar  in Blekinge, Bohuslän, Halland and Scania.

The combination of occasionally similar and rather unusual sounds as well as the large variety of partly overlapping allophones of  often presents difficulties for non-natives in telling the two apart.

The Swedish phoneme  (the "sje-sound" or voiceless postalveolar-velar fricative) and its alleged coarticulation is a difficult and complex issue debated amongst phoneticians. Though the acoustic properties of its  allophones are fairly similar, the realizations can vary considerably according to geography, age, gender as well as social context and are notoriously difficult to describe and transcribe accurately. A voiceless uvular fricative, can sometimes be used in the varieties influenced by major immigrant languages like Arabic and Kurdish. The different realizations can be divided roughly into the following categories:

"Dark sounds" – , commonly used in the Southern Standard Swedish. Some of the varieties specific, but not exclusive, to areas with a larger immigrant population that commonly realizes the phoneme as a voiceless uvular fricative .
Combination of "light" and "dark" – darker sounds are used as morpheme initials preceding stressed vowels (sjuk 'sick', station 'station'), while the lighter sounds are used before unstressed vowels and at the end of morphemes (bagage 'baggage', dusch 'shower').

Sonorants

 has distinct variations in Standard Swedish. For most speakers, the realization as an alveolar trill occurs only in contexts where emphatic stress is used. In Central Swedish, it is often pronounced as a fricative (transcribed as ) or approximant (transcribed as ), which is especially frequent in weakly articulated positions such as word-finally and somewhat less frequent in stressed syllable onsets, in particular after other consonants. It may also be an apico-alveolar tap. In Finland,  is usually an apical trill , and may be an approximant  postvocalically.

Thus sorl ('murmur') may be pronounced , but also .

In Gothenburg and neighbouring areas (such as Mölndal and Kungälv) the retroflex consonants are substituted by alveolar ones, with their effects still remaining.

In the southern varieties, which use a uvular , retroflex realizations do not occur. An  spelled  usually will not trigger retroflexion so that spärrnät  ('anti-sub net') is pronounced . The process of retroflexion is not limited to just one dental, and e.g. först is pronounced . Retroflexion also does not usually occur in Finland.

In casual speech, the nasals tend to assimilate to the place of articulation of a following obstruent so that, for example, han kom ('he came') is pronounced .

Stress and pitch

As in English, there are many Swedish word pairs that are differentiated by stress:

formel  — 'formula'
formell  — 'formal'

Stressed syllables differentiate two tones, often described as pitch accents, or tonal word accents by Scandinavian linguists. They are called acute and grave accent, tone/accent 1 and tone/accent 2, or Single Tone and Double Tone. The actual realizations of these two tones varies from dialect to dialect.  In the central Swedish dialect of Stockholm, accent 1 is an LHL contour and accent 2 is an HLHL contour (with the second peak in the second syllable). Generally, the grave accent is characterized by a later timing of the intonational pitch rise as compared with the acute accent; the so-called two-peaked dialects (such as Central and Western Swedish) also have another, earlier pitch peak in the grave accent, hence the term "two-peaked".

The phonemicity of this tonal system is demonstrated in the nearly 300 pairs of two-syllable words differentiated only by their use of either grave or acute accent. Outside of these pairs, the main tendency for tone is that the acute accent appears in monosyllables (since the grave accent cannot appear in monosyllabic words) while the grave accent appears in polysyllabic words. Polysyllabic forms resulting from declension or derivation also tend to have a grave accent except when it is the definite article that is added. This tonal distinction has been present in Scandinavian dialects at least since Old Norse though a greater number of polysyllables now have an acute accent. These are mostly words that were monosyllabic in Old Norse, but have subsequently become disyllabic, as have many loanwords.  For example, Old Norse kømr ('comes') has become kommer in Swedish (with an acute accent).

The distinction can be shown with the minimal pair anden 'the mallard' (tone 1) and anden 'the spirit' (tone 2).

Acute accent:  (realized  = ) 'the mallard' (from and 'mallard')
In Central Swedish, this is a high, slightly falling tone followed by a low tone; that is, a single drop from high to low pitch spread over two syllables.
Grave accent:  (realized  = ) 'the spirit' (from ande 'spirit')
In Central Swedish, a mid falling tone followed by a high falling tone; that is, a double falling tone.

The exact realization of the tones also depends on the syllable's position in an utterance. For instance, at the beginning of an utterance, the acute accent may have a rising rather than slightly falling pitch on the first syllable. Also, these are word tones that are spread across the syllables of the word.  In trisyllabic words with the grave accent, the second fall in pitch is distributed across the second and third syllables:

Grave-accent trisyllable: flickorna  (realized  = ) 'the girls'

The position of the tone is dependent upon stress: The first stressed syllable has a high or falling tone, as does the following syllable(s) in grave-accented words.

In most Finland-Swedish varieties, however, the distinction between grave and acute accent is missing.

A reasonably complete list of uncontroversial so-called minimal pairs can be seen below. The two words in each pair are distinguished solely by having different tone (acute vs. grave). In those cases where both words are nouns it would have been possible to list the genitive forms of the words as well, thereby creating another word pair, but this has been avoided. A few word pairs where one of the words is a plural form with the suffix -or have been included. This is due to the fact that many Swedish-speakers in all parts of Sweden pronounce the suffix -or the same way as -er.

Note that karaten/karaten is the only pair with more than two syllables (although we would get a second one if we used the definite forms of the pair perser/pärser, i.e. perserna/pärserna). The word pair länder (=countries, plural of land) and länder (=loins, plural of länd) could have been included, but this one is controversial. For those speakers who have grave accent in the plural of länd, the definite plural forms will also constitute a three-syllable minimal pair: länderna (acute accent, =the countries) vs. länderna (grave accent, =the loins). Although examples with more than two syllables are very few in Standard Swedish, it is possible to find other three-syllable pairs in regional dialects, such as Värmländska: hunnera (acute, =the Huns) vs. hunnera (grave, =the dogs), ändera/ännera (acute, =the mallards) vs. ändera/ännera (grave, =the ends), etc.

Prosody in Swedish often varies substantially between different dialects including the spoken varieties of Standard Swedish. As in most languages, stress can be applied to emphasize certain words in a sentence. To some degree prosody may indicate questions, although less so than in English.

Phonotactics
At a minimum, a stressed syllable must consist of either a long vowel or a short vowel and a long consonant.  Like many other Germanic languages, Swedish has a tendency for closed syllables with a relatively large number of consonant clusters in initial as well as final position. Though not as complex as that of most Slavic languages, examples of up to 7 consecutive consonants can occur when adding Swedish inflections to some foreign loanwords or names, and especially when combined with the tendency of Swedish to make long compound nouns. The syllable structure of Swedish can therefore be described with the following formula:

(C)(C)(C)V(C)(C)(C)

This means that a Swedish one-syllable morpheme can have up to three consonants preceding the vowel that forms the nucleus of the syllable, and three consonants following it. Examples: skrämts  (verb 'scare' past participle, passive voice) or sprängts  (verb 'explode' past participle, passive voice).

In some cases this can result in very complex combinations, such as in västkustskt , consisting of västkust ('west coast') with the adjective suffix -sk and the neuter suffix -t.

Central Standard Swedish and most other Swedish dialects feature a rare "complementary quantity" feature wherein a phonologically short consonant follows a long vowel and a long consonant follows a short vowel; this is true only for stressed syllables and all segments are short in unstressed syllables. In literature on Swedish phonology, there are a number of ways to transcribe complementary relationship, including:
 A length mark  for either the vowel or the consonant
 Gemination of the consonant ( vs. )
 Diphthongization of the vowel ( vs. )
 The position of the stress marker ( vs. )

With the conventional assumption that medial long consonants are ambisyllabic (that is, penna ('pen'), is syllabified as ), all stressed syllables are thus "heavy". With each successive post-stress syllable, the number of contrasting vowels decreases gradually with distance from the point of stress; at three syllables from stress, only  and  occur.

Sample

The sample text is a reading of The North Wind and the Sun. The transcriptions are based on the section on Swedish found in The Handbook on the International Phonetic Association, in which a man in his forties from Stockholm is recorded reading out the traditional fable in a manner typical of Central Standard Swedish as spoken in his area. The broad transcription is phonemic while the narrow is phonetic.

Broad transcription

Narrow transcription

Orthographic version
Nordanvinden och solen tvistade en gång om vem av dem som var starkast. Just då kom en vandrare vägen fram, insvept i en varm kappa. De kom då överens om att den som först kunde få vandraren att ta av sig kappan, han skulle anses vara starkare än den andra. Då blåste nordanvinden så hårt han någonsin kunde, men ju hårdare han blåste, desto tätare svepte vandraren kappan om sig, och till slut gav nordanvinden upp försöket. Då lät solen sina strålar skina helt varmt och genast tog vandraren av sig kappan, och så var nordanvinden tvungen att erkänna att solen var den starkaste av de två.

Notes

References

Further reading

External links
Introduction to Swedish – A guide to pronunciation (Stockholm School of Economics)

Swedish language
Germanic phonologies